Dasycorixa rawsoni is a species of water boatman in the family Corixidae. It is found in North America.

References

Further reading

 

Glaenocorisini
Articles created by Qbugbot
Insects described in 1948